Dainichi-ji is a Shingon Buddhist Temple located in Kōnan, Kōchi, Japan. It is the 28th temple of the Shikoku Pilgrimage.

References 

Buddhist temples in Kōchi Prefecture